Konda may refer to:

Kondia or Konda, 18th century Mansi principality, Russia
Konda (river) in the Khanty-Mansi Autonomous Okrug, Russia
Konda (Vitim), river in Buryatia, Russia
Konda, South Konawe, a kecamatan in Southeast Sulawesi, Indonesia.
Konda, Angola, municipality in Cuanza Sul Province, Angola
Konda, either of two towns in Ogooué-Lolo Province, Gabon
Konda, village in Njikwa, Cameroon
the Konda language (Papuan) of Indonesia
the Konda language (Dravidian) of India, a member of the Dravidian languages
Konda, one of the Scheduled Tribes in India
KONDA Research and Consultancy is a Turkish public opinion research and consultancy company established in 1986.
Konda Bimbaša (fl. 1804–06), Ottoman Greek mercenary turned Serbian rebel
A song by Miles Davis on his Directions album
Konda (film), 2022 Indian Telugu-language political crime thriller film

See also 
 Conda (disambiguation)